Mayflower High School, founded in 1965, and named after the Mayflower ship, is a coeducational, secondary school located in Billericay, Essex in the East of England in the United Kingdom. The school has a mixed intake of pupils aged 11–18 (School years 7 to 13) and is an academy. As of June 2006 the number of enrolled pupils was 1,418. Mayflower has specialisms in science and mathematics as well as languages.

Specialisms 
The school has specialisms in mathematics and science, and languages, and supports this with a regular specialisms newsletter distributed amongst its students and parents.

A house on site facilitates the staying of language assistants, natives of either Germany, Spain or France, to assist students with their language studies, and all three subjects are complemented by trips to the relevant country, previous trips having sent students to Santander and Barcelona.

Notable former pupils
 Karen Gorham, Bishop of Sherborne in the Church of England

References

External links

 Essex BSF Schools

Academies in Essex
Borough of Basildon
Secondary schools in Essex
Billericay
Educational institutions established in 1965
1965 establishments in England
Specialist maths and computing colleges in England
Specialist language colleges in England
Specialist science colleges in England